FK Mogren was a football club based in Budva, Montenegro. Founded in 1920, it was two times champion of Montenegrin First League and once winner of Montenegrin Cup.

In 2015, following the bankruptcy and debts, FK Mogren was relegated to the lowest-rank competition of football in Montenegro. In March 2017, FK Mogren was expelled from South region of the Third Montenegrin league. Mogren was extiguinshed in 2017. Group of enthusiasts tried to register new club under the name Mogren 1920, but Ministry of Sports did not allow them. Instead, FK Budva was founded and started with youth sections.

History

Period 1920–2006
FK Mogren was founded in 1920 as FK Budva. In the period 1921–1941, the team played in the Montenegrin Football Championship (1922–1940) but without significant successes.
After 1945, in the SFR Yugoslavia era, FK Budva participated in Fourth League – South (lowest rank) and won the title on season 1966–67, which meant promotion to the Montenegrin Republic League. Until the end of the 1970s, FK Budva played their seasons only in the Republic League and lower ranks.
For the first time in history, FK Budva won the title in the Montenegrin Republic League on season 1980–81, doubled with the trophy of Montenegrin Republic Cup winner same year. Third league title gave to FK Budva historical promotion to Yugoslav Second League. From 1988–89, FK Budva played in Yugoslav Third League and in 1990, the club was renamed FK Mogren.
For the first time, FK Mogren played in the Yugoslav First League in the 1992–93 season. Until 2006, they spent five seasons in the Yugoslav First League. FK Mogren is the only team from Montenegrin seacoast who ever played in the First League of Yugoslavia.

Period 2006–2016
After the Montenegrin independence, FK Mogren became a member of the Montenegrin First League, finishing 5th in its inaugural season. In the second season of the league, (2007–08), the club finished in third place on 66 points, losing out on the title on goal difference to Buducnost. The position allowed Mogren to compete in the 2008–09 UEFA Cup, where they played Israeli club Hapoel Ironi Kiryat in the first qualifying round. Despite a 1–1 away draw in the first leg, Mogren went out 4–1 on aggregate. On 7 May 2008, Mogren won their first silverware by defeating Buducnost 6–5 on penalties after a 1–1 draw in the Montenegrin Cup final at the Stadion Pod Goricom in Podgorica.
Mogren won their first league title in 2008–09 with a four-point margin over Buducnost, and qualified for the UEFA Champions League for the first time. Their Champions League campaign in 2009–10 opened with a 6–0 aggregate victory over Hibernians of Malta before a 12–0 aggregate defeat to FC Copenhagen of Denmark in the second qualifying round. In the 2009–10 season, Mogren finished third in the league to qualify for the first qualifying round of the next season's UEFA Europa League, where they won 5–0 on aggregate over UE Santa Coloma of Andorra. The second leg saw Mogren take on Israeli club Maccabi Tel Aviv and lose the first leg 2–0 away. The subsequent 2–1 home victory for Mogren saw them eliminated 3–2 on aggregate.
Mogren gained their second league title in 2010–11 on goal difference after both they and Buducnost finished level on 73 points. On 28 May that year, Mogren played in their second Montenegrin Cup final, but were defeated 5–4 on penalties by Rudar after a 2–2 draw. The league triumph allowed Mogren to enter the 2011-12 UEFA Champions League, which saw them eliminated immediately in the second qualifying round after losing both legs to Litex Lovech of Bulgaria.
After many successful seasons, at period from 2013 to 2015, FK Mogren, under the debts and crisis, played relegation playoffs in Montenegrin League, and after the 2014–15 season they were automatically relegated to the Third League. Soon after that, following the debts and bankruptcy, FK Mogren was dissolved.

First League Record

For the first time, FK Mogren played in Yugoslav First League on season 1992–93. Below is a list of FK Mogren scores in First League by every single season.

Seasons with green background were played in the first league of Yugoslavia or Serbia and Montenegro, together with Serbian clubs.

FK Mogren in European competitions

For the first time, FK Mogren played in European competitions in season 2008–09. Until now, they played four seasons in European cups.

Honours and achievements
Montenegrin First League – 2
winners (2): 2008–09, 2010–11
Montenegrin Cup – 1
winners (1): 2007–08
 runners-up (1): 2010–11
Second Yugoslav League – 2
winners (2): 1997–98, 2001–02
 Montenegrin Republic League – 1
winners (1): 1980–81
 Montenegrin Republic Cup – 1
winners (1): 1980–81

Players

Latest squad

Notable players
For the list of former and current players with Wikipedia article, please see :Category:FK Mogren players.
Below is the list of most-known players which, during their career, played for FK Mogren.

 Miodrag Bajović
 Radoslav Batak
 Zoran Batrović
 Branko Bošković
 Damir Čakar
 Dragan Đukanović
 Igor Gluščević
 Almir Gredić
 Suleiman Omo
 Srđan Radonjić
 Predrag Ranđelović
 Vladimir Vujović
 Dejan Vukićević
 Ranko Zirojević

Historical list of coaches

 Mojaš Radonjić (1992 – 1993)
 Slobodan Halilović (1997 - 2000)
 Stevan Mojsilović (2002)
 Dragan Lacmanović (2003)
 Slobodan Halilović (2003 - 2005)
 Dragan Đukanović (2006)
 Miodrag Bajović (17 Oct 2006 - Aug 2007)
 Dejan Vukićević (26 Aug 2007 - Apr 2010)
 Stevan Mojsilović (11 Apr 2010 - Apr 2011)
 Branislav Milačić (13 Apr 2011 – Dec 2016)

Stadium

The club played at Stadion Lugovi, near the main beach in Budva. Stadium capacity is 1,500 seats on two stands and it doesn't meet UEFA standards for European competitions. After they were relegated to the Montenegrin Third League, FK Mogren played most of its matches at Jaz football complex near Budva.

Sponsors
Official sponsor: Municipality of Budva
Official kit supplier: Puma

See also
Budva
Montenegrin Third League
Montenegrin clubs in Yugoslav football competitions (1946–2006)

References

External links
Profile by Weltfussballarchiv 

 
Defunct football clubs in Montenegro
Association football clubs established in 1920
1920 establishments in Montenegro
Association football clubs disestablished in 2017
2017 disestablishments in Montenegro
Sport in Budva